Valve-sparing aortic root replacement (also known as the David procedure) is a cardiac surgery procedure which is used to treat Aortic aneurysms and to prevent Aortic dissection. It involves replacement of the aortic root without replacement of the aortic valve.  Two similar procedures were developed, one by Sir Magdi Yacoub, and another by Tirone David.

Techniques

Re-modeling Technique
Established by Sir Magdi Yacoub.

Re-implantation Technique
Established by Tirone David and Christopher Feindel at the Toronto General Hospital.

See also
 Aortic aneurysm
 Aortic dissection
 Marfan syndrome

References

External links
 Chapter 31: Aortic Valve Repair and Aortic Valve-Sparing Operations by Tirone E. David in Cardiac Surgery in the Adult

Cardiac surgery